SCSI Pass Through Interface (SPTI) is an application programming interface (API) accessing a SCSI device. It is developed by Microsoft Corporation and is part of the Windows NT family of operating systems.

Overview 
The storage port drivers provide an interface for Win32 applications to send SCSI Command Descriptor Block (CDB) messages to SCSI devices. The interfaces are IOCTL_SCSI_PASS_THROUGH and IOCTL_SCSI_PASS_THROUGH_DIRECT. Applications can build a pass-through request and send it to the device by using this IOCTL.

SPTI is accessible to Windows software using the DeviceIoControl Windows API.

ImgBurn offers SPTI as a method for accessing optical disc drives.

Other SCSI interfaces 
 Windows:
 Advanced SCSI Programming Interface (ASPI) by Adaptec, Nero AG and Pinnacle Systems
 ASAPI by VOB Computersysteme GmbH and Pinnacle Systems
 ElbyCDIO by Elaborate Bytes
 Patin-Couffin by VSO Software
 SCSI Pass-Through Direct (SPTD) by Duplex Secure, Ltd.
 The SCSI pass-through driver for Linux is called "SCSI generic"

References

Further reading 

Application programming interfaces
SCSI
Device drivers